Zhu Jun (born 2 July 1984 in Gaoyou, Yangzhou, Jiangsu) is a Chinese foil fencer, who competed at the 2008 Summer Olympics and the 2012 Summer Olympics.

Major performances
2003 World Junior Championships - 1st team/individual
2006 Asian Games - 1st team;
2008 Beijing Olympics - 4th Individual 
2008 World Cup Germany - 3rd
2009 World Fencing Championships - 2nd

See also
China at the 2008 Summer Olympics

References

1984 births
Living people
Fencers at the 2008 Summer Olympics
Fencers at the 2012 Summer Olympics
Olympic fencers of China
Sportspeople from Yangzhou
Chinese male fencers
Fencers from Jiangsu
Asian Games medalists in fencing
Fencers at the 2006 Asian Games
Fencers at the 2010 Asian Games
Asian Games gold medalists for China
Medalists at the 2006 Asian Games
Medalists at the 2010 Asian Games
Universiade medalists in fencing
Universiade gold medalists for China
Universiade bronze medalists for China
Medalists at the 2011 Summer Universiade